Andrew Olusola Ajayi is an Anglican bishop in Nigeria: born on July 2, 1959, he is the current Bishop of Ekiti Diocese. Translated from the Missionary Diocese of Ekiti Kwara, where he was the pioneer Bishop since May 26, 2008. He was elected and translated on July 2, 2022, on his 63rd birthday. He was enthroned 6th Bishop of Ekiti Diocese, Anglican Communion on Saturday August 13, 2022 at the Cathedral Church of Emmanuel. Okesha, Ado Ekiti. Rt. Rev. Andrew Olusola Ajayi Diploma in Theology of Emmanuel College of Theology, Ibadan, Nigeria. Diploma in Religious Studies of University of Ibadan, Nigeria. B. A. (Hons) Obafemi Awolowo University Ife,  Master of Arts in Theology (New Testament), Master of Theology (STM) of Union Theological Seminary, New York City, USA. He is happily married to his loving wife, Mrs Abimbola Ajayi and the marriage is blessed with wonderful children.

Notes

Living people
Anglican bishops of Ekiti Kwara
21st-century Anglican bishops in Nigeria
Year of birth missing (living people)